Erruca deyrolii is a moth of the family Erebidae. It was described by Francis Walker in 1854. It is found in South America.

References

Moths described in 1854